El Salvador competed at the 2016 Summer Olympics in Rio de Janeiro, Brazil, from 5 to 21 August 2016. This was the nation's eleventh appearance at the Summer Olympics, although it first competed in 1968.

El Salvador Olympic Committee confirmed a team of eight athletes, five men and three women, to compete in six sports at the Games. This was also the youngest delegation in El Salvador's Summer Olympic history, with more than half under the age of 25, and many of them were expected to reach their peak in time for the 2020 Olympics in Tokyo.

Majority of El Salvador's athletes made their Olympic debut in Rio de Janeiro, with weightlifter Julio Salamanca being the only sportsman to return for his second appearance from London 2012. Other notable Salvadoran athletes featured Enrique Arathoon, the nation's first ever sailor for nearly half a century, and Marcelo Acosta, bronze medalist in long-distance freestyle swimming at the Youth Olympics in Nanjing two years earlier. Air pistol shooter Lilian Castro, the oldest member of the squad (aged 29), acted as El Salvador's flag bearer in the opening ceremony.

El Salvador, however,  yet to win its first Olympic medal.

Athletics (track and field)
 
Salvadoran athletes have so far achieved qualifying standards in the following athletics events (up to a maximum of 3 athletes in each event):

Track & road events

Judo

El Salvador  qualified one judoka for the men's half-middleweight category (81 kg) at the Games. Juan Diego Turcios earned a continental quota spot from the Pan American region, as El Salvador's top-ranked judoka outside of direct qualifying position in the IJF World Ranking List of 30 May 2016.

Sailing
 
El Salvador  qualified a boat in men's Laser class by virtue of a top finish for Central & South America at the 2015 Pan American Games, signifying the nation's Olympic return to the sport for the first time since 1968.

M = Medal race; EL = Eliminated – did not advance into the medal race

Shooting
 
El Salvador  qualified one shooter in the women's pistol events by virtue of her best finish at the 2014 American Continental Championships, and other selection competitions, as long as she obtained a minimum qualifying score (MQS) by 31 March 2016.

Qualification Legend: Q = Qualify for the next round; q = Qualify for the bronze medal (shotgun)

Swimming

Salvadoran swimmers have so far achieved qualifying standards in the following events (up to a maximum of 2 swimmers in each event at the Olympic Qualifying Time (OQT), and potentially 1 at the Olympic Selection Time (OST)):

Weightlifting

El Salvador  received an unused quota place from IWF to send a male weightlifter to the Olympics, as a response to the complete ban of the Russian weightlifting team from the Games due to "multiple positive" cases of doping.

See also
El Salvador at the 2015 Pan American Games

References

External links 
 

Nations at the 2016 Summer Olympics
2016
2016 in Salvadoran sport